Dexter Bexley and the Big Blue Beastie is a children's picture book by Joel Stewart, published in 2007. It won the Nestlé Children's Book Prize Bronze Award.

References

Children's fiction books
2007 children's books
Doubleday (publisher) books
British picture books
British children's books